Hyposada aspersa is a species of moth of the family Noctuidae first described by Turner in 1945. It is found in Queensland, Australia.

References

Moths described in 1945
Acontiinae